NTCC may refer to:

New Testament Christian Churches of America
Northeast Texas Community College, USA
Nantou County Council, Taiwan
New Town Cricket Club, Australia
Norwegian Touring Car Championship
National Theatre Company of China